Demon is a 2015 Polish horror film written and directed by Marcin Wrona. It was shown in the Vanguard section of the 2015 Toronto International Film Festival. It was Wrona's last feature film, as he died by suicide on 19 September 2015 while promoting the film at the Gdynia Film Festival.

Plot
Piotr (Itay Tiran), who has been living and working in England for many years, and Zaneta (Agnieszka Zulewska), a Polish lady, are to be married; they had met only over the Internet, but he knew her brother. Piotr speaks Polish awkwardly, remembering more from his ancestors than from personal experience. He moves into a run-down large rural estate previously owned by Zaneta's grandfather.

While digging in the yard with a backhoe right before the wedding, Piotr finds a skeleton, which at first he keeps quiet about. He is increasingly haunted by the vision of a woman in a wedding dress – Hana. During the wedding reception this vision draws closer and closer to him, and he has apparent seizures. He is eventually possessed by Hana, the woman in the dress. Zaneta's family is well-to-do, and they want to keep his breakdown quiet from the rest of the wedding guests, so they distract their guests with vodka and loud music while locking Piotr in the basement, first with a doctor, then a priest. Finally, the "teacher" (Wlodzimierz Press, who appears to be the only surviving Jewish resident of the town pre-war), realizes that Piotr is speaking Yiddish, and that he is possessed by the spirit of Hana, a lovely Jewish girl he knew before the war who suddenly disappeared.

The film is a re-telling of a classic dybbuk story and also an allegory for Polish-Jewish relations before and after the war. It is implied that Zaneta's grandfather may have gotten rich in part by "possessing" this property once its former Jewish residents were gone.

Cast
 Itay Tiran as Piotr "Pyton"
 Agnieszka Zulewska as Zaneta
 Tomasz Schuchardt as "Jasny"
 Andrzej Grabowski as Zaneta's father
 Tomasz Ziętek as Ronaldo
 Katarzyna Gniewkowska as Gabryjelska
 Maria Dębska as Hana
 Adam Woronowicz as Doctor

Reception

Critical response
On review aggregator Rotten Tomatoes, Demon holds an approval rating of 92%, based on 66 reviews, and an average rating of 7.4/10. Its consensus reads, "Ambitious and beautifully shot, Demon delivers a gripping – and sadly final – testament to the singular talent possessed by director/co-writer Marcin Wrona." On Metacritic, the film has a weighted average score of 80 out of 100, based on 19 critics, indicating "generally positive reviews".

Chuck Bowen from Slant Magazine gave the film 3.5 out of 4 stars, writing, "Demon offers a tidal wave of unrelieved longing and regret, with a devilish streak of absurdism."
Giuseppe Sedia of the Krakow Post noted that the character played by Israeli actor Itay Tiran turns out to be "the most tormented groom ever seen in Polish film". He added that "the distastrous reception is drenched in vodka just like the banquet displayed in Wojciech Smarzowski's The Wedding but purged from any black comedy". Jake Dee from Arrow in the Head rated the film a score of 8/10, writing, "Shot with a steady and sure-handed formalistic lens, played with credible pathos by all involved, belled with a quizzically unnerving score – despite the humor hampering the horror at times – Demon is a bold and balefully bedeviling Polish delight!" Justin Chang of the Los Angeles Times praised the film's cinematography, and called it " A bravura testament to a talent silenced far too soon.". Joshua Rothkopf from Time Out awarded the film 4 out of 5 stars, writing, "Nailing a tricky sense of physical anarchy (as well as some far subtler domestic tensions), Marcin Wrona’s Polish import is an eerie, extraordinarily poised piece of horror."

The film was not without its detractors. Joe Leydon from Variety commended the film's atmosphere and absurdist humor, but slammed the film's third act. Chris Nashawaty of Entertainment Weekly rated the film a grade C, writing, "Heavy on atmosphere and symbolism but light on actual scares, director Marcin Wrona’s generically titled Demon is a so-so meditation on historical amnesia. It's also so weighted down with mysticism and metaphor it forgets to quicken your pulse or whiten your knuckles." The film was also cited as a possible victim of vote brigading on IMDb.

References

External links
 
 
 
 

2015 films
2015 drama films
2015 horror films
2015 fantasy films
2015 psychological thriller films
2015 thriller drama films
2010s horror drama films
2010s psychological horror films
2010s supernatural horror films
Demons in film
Dybbuks in film
Films set in country houses
Films shot in Poland
Polish films based on plays
Polish drama films
Polish horror films
2010s Polish-language films
2010s Russian-language films
Yiddish-language films
2010s English-language films